Capazo District is one of five districts of the province El Collao in Puno Region, Peru.

Geography 
Some of the highest mountains of the district are listed below:

 Jiwaña
 Llallawa
 Sura Wiqu
 Tuma Tumani
 Uma Jalsu
 Wanq'uri
 Wila Chunkara

Authorities

Mayors 
 2011-2014: Gualberto Uruche Gutiérrez. 
 2007-2010: Modesto Mayta Ccollo.

See also 
 Administrative divisions of Peru

References

External links 
 INEI Peru